Taslima Nasrin (born 25 August 1962) is a Bangladeshi-Swedish writer, physician, feminist, secular humanist, and activist. She is known for her writing on women's oppression and criticism of religion; some of her books are banned in Bangladesh. She has also been blacklisted and banished from the Bengal region, both from Bangladesh and the Indian state of West Bengal.

She gained global attention by the beginning of 1990s owing to her essays and novels with feminist views and criticism of what she characterizes as all "misogynistic" religions. Nasrin has been living in exile since 1994, with multiple fatwas calling for her death. After living more than a decade in Europe and the United States, she moved to India in 2004, but was banished from the country in 2008, although she has been staying in India on a resident permit long-term, multiple-entry or 'X' visa since 2004. She now lives in New Delhi, India.

Early life and career
Nasrin was the daughter of Dr. Rajab Ali and Edul Ara, who were from a Bengali Muslim of Mymensingh. Her father was a physician, and a professor of Medical Jurisprudence in Mymensingh Medical College, also at Sir Salimullah Medical College, Dhaka and Dhaka Medical College. After high school in 1976 (SSC) and higher secondary studies in college (HSC) in 1978, she studied medicine at the Mymensingh Medical College, an affiliated medical college of the University of Dhaka and graduated in 1984 with an MBBS degree. In college, she wrote and edited a poetry journal called Shenjuti. After graduation, she worked at a family planning clinic in Mymensingh, then practised at the gynaecology department of Mitford hospital and at the anaesthesia department of Dhaka Medical College hospital. While she studied and practised medicine, she saw girls who had been raped; she also heard women cry out in despair in the delivery room if their baby was a girl. She was born into a Muslim family; however, she became an atheist over time. In the course of writing she took a feminist approach.

Literary career
Early in her literary career, Nasrin wrote mainly poetry, and published half a dozen collections of poetry between 1982 and 1993, often with female oppression as a theme, and often containing very graphic language. She started publishing prose in the late 1980s, and produced three collections of essays and four novels before the publication of her documentary novel Lajja in which a Hindu family was being attacked by Muslim fanatics and decided to leave the country. Nasrin suffered a number of physical and other attacks for her critical scrutiny of Islam and her demand for women's equality. Hundreds of thousands of fanatics took to the streets demanding her execution by hanging. In October 1993, a radical fundamentalist group called the Council of Islamic Soldiers offered a bounty for her death. In May 1994 she was interviewed by the Kolkata edition of The Statesman, which quoted her as calling for a revision of the Quran; she claims she only called for abolition of the Sharia, the Islamic religious law. In August 1994 she was brought up on "charges of making inflammatory statements," and faced criticism from Islamic fundamentalists. A few hundred thousand demonstrators called her "an apostate appointed by imperial forces to vilify Islam"; a member of a "militant faction threatened to set loose thousands of poisonous snakes in the capital unless she was executed." After spending two months in hiding, at the end of 1994 she escaped to Sweden, consequently ceasing her medical practice and becoming a full-time writer and activist.

Life in exile
After fleeing Bangladesh in 1994, Nasrin spent the next ten years in exile in Sweden, Germany, France and the US. She returned to the East and relocated to Kolkata, India, in 2004, where she lived until 2007. After she was physically attacked by fanatics in Hyderabad, she was forced to live under house arrest in Kolkata, and finally, she was made to leave West Bengal on 22 November 2007. She was then forced to live under house arrest in New Delhi for three months. She had no other alternative but to leave India in 2008. She was not allowed to live in India for a while, but ultimately Nasrin, determined to live in the subcontinent, moved to India from the US.

Leaving Bangladesh towards the end of 1994, Nasrin lived in exile in Western Europe and North America for ten years. Her Bangladeshi passport had been revoked; she was granted citizenship by the Swedish government and took refuge in Germany. She allegedly had to wait for six years (1994–1999) to get a visa to visit India. In 1998 she wrote Meyebela, My Bengali Girlhood, her biographical account from birth to adolescence. She never got a Bangladeshi passport to return to the country when her mother, and later her father, were on their deathbeds.

2004–2007, life in Kolkata

In 2004, she was granted a renewable temporary residential permit by India and moved to Kolkata in the state of West Bengal, which shares a common heritage and language with Bangladesh; in an interview in 2007, after she had been forced to flee, she called Kolkata her home. The government of India extended her visa to stay in the country on a periodic basis, though it refused to grant her Indian citizenship. While living in Kolkata, Nasrin regularly contributed to Indian newspapers and magazines, including Anandabazar Patrika and Desh, and, for some time, wrote a weekly column in the Bengali version of The Statesman.

Again her criticism of Islam was met with opposition from religious fundamentalists: in June 2006, Syed Noorur Rehaman Barkati, the imam of Kolkata's Tipu Sultan Mosque, admitted offering money to anyone who "blackened [that is, publicly humiliated] Ms Nasreen's face." Even abroad she caused controversy: in 2005, she tried to read an anti-war poem titled "America" to a large Bengali crowd at the North American Bengali Conference at Madison Square Garden in New York City, and was booed off the stage. Back in India, the "All India Muslim Personal Board (Jadeed)" offered 500,000 rupees for her beheading in March 2007. The group's president, Tauqeer Raza Khan, said the only way the bounty would be lifted was if Nasrin "apologises, burns her books and leaves."

In 2007, elected and serving members of All India Majlis-e-Ittehadul Muslimeen made threats against Taslima Nasreen, pledging that the fatwa against her and Salman Rushdie were to be abided by. While she was in Hyderabad releasing Telugu translations of her work, she was attacked by party members led by 3 MLAs- Mohammed Muqtada Khan, Mohammed Moazzam Khan and Syed Ahmed Pasha Quadri - were then charged and arrested.

Expulsion from Kolkata
On 9 August 2007, Nasrin was in Hyderabad to present the Telugu translation of one of her novels, Shodh, when she was allegedly attacked by a mob, led by legislators from the Majlis-e-Ittehadul Muslimeen, an Indian political party. A week later, on 17 August, Muslim leaders in Kolkata revived an old fatwa against her, urging her to leave the country and offering an unlimited amount of money to anybody who would kill her. On 21 November, Kolkata witnessed a protest against Nasrin. A protest organised by the "All India Minority Forum" caused chaos in the city and forced the army's deployment to restore order. After the riots, Nasrin was forced to move from Kolkata, her "adopted city," to Jaipur, and to New Delhi the following day.

The government of India kept Nasrin in an undisclosed location in New Delhi, effectively under house arrest, for more than seven months. In January 2008, she was selected for the Simone de Beauvoir award in recognition of her writing on women's rights, but declined to go to Paris to receive the award. She explained that "I don't want to leave India at this stage and would rather fight for my freedom here," but she had to be hospitalised for three days with several complaints. The house arrest quickly acquired an international dimension: in a letter to the London-based human rights organisation Amnesty International, India's former foreign secretary Muchkund Dubey urged the organisation to pressure the Indian government so Nasrin could safely return to Kolkata.

From New Delhi, Nasrin commented: "I'm writing a lot, but not about Islam, It's not my subject now. This is about politics. In the last three months I have been put under severe pressure to leave [West] Bengal by the police." In an email interview from the undisclosed safehouse, Nasrin talked about the stress caused by "this unendurable loneliness, this uncertainty and this deathly silence." She cancelled the publication of the sixth part of her autobiography Nei Kichu Nei ("No Entity"), and — under pressure — deleted some passages from Dwikhandito, the controversial book that was the boost for the riots in Kolkata. She was forced to leave India on 19 March 2008.

Nasrin moved to Sweden in 2008 and later worked as a research scholar at New York University. Since, as she claims, "her soul lived in India," she also pledged her body to the country, by awarding it for posthumous medical use to Gana Darpan, a Kolkata-based NGO, in 2005. She eventually returned to India, but was forced to stay in New Delhi as the West Bengal government refused to permit her entry.. Currently her visa received a one-year extension in 2016 and Nasreen is also seeking permanent residency in India but no decision has been taken on it by the Home Ministry

In 2015 Nasrin was threatened with death by Al Qaeda-linked extremists, and so the Center for Inquiry assisted her in travelling to the United States, where she now lives. The Center for Inquiry (CFI) that helped evacuate her to the U.S. on 27 May gave an official statement in June 2015 stating that her safety "is only temporary if she cannot remain in the U.S., however, which is why CFI has established an emergency fund to help with food, housing, and the means for her to be safely settled".

Literary works

Nasrin started writing poetry when she was thirteen. While still at college in Mymensingh, she published and edited a literary magazine, SeNjuti ("Light in the dark"), from 1978 to 1983. She published her first collection of poems in 1986. Her second collection, Nirbashito Bahire Ontore ("Banished within and without") was published in 1989. She succeeded in attracting a wider readership when she started writing columns in late 1980s, and, in the early 1990s, she began writing novels, for which she has won significant acclaim. In all, she has written more than thirty books of poetry, essays, novels, short stories, and memoirs, and her books have been translated into 20 different languages.

Her own experience of sexual abuse during adolescence and her work as a gynaecologist influenced her a great deal in writing about the alleged treatment of women in Islam and against religion in general. Her writing is characterised by two connected elements: her struggle with the Islam of her native culture, and her feminist philosophy. She cites Virginia Woolf and Simone de Beauvoir as influences, and, when pushed to think of one closer to home, Begum Rokeya, who lived during the time of undivided Bengal. Her later poetry also evidences a connection to place, to Bangladesh and India.

Columns and essays
In 1989 Nasrin began to contribute to the weekly political magazine Khaborer Kagoj, edited by Nayeemul Islam Khan, and published from Dhaka. Her feminist views and anti-religion remarks articles succeeded in drawing broad attention, and she shocked the religious and conservative society of Bangladesh by her radical comments and suggestions. Later she collected these columns in a volume titled Nirbachita Column, which in 1992 won her first Ananda Purashkar award, a prestigious award for Bengali writers. During her life in Kolkata, she contributed a weekly essay to the Bengali version of The Statesman, called Dainik Statesman. Taslima has always advocated for an Indian Uniform civil code, and said that criticism of Islam is the only way to establish secularism in Islamic countries. Taslima said that Triple talaq is despicable and the All India Muslim Personal Law Board should be abolished. Taslima used to write articles for online media venture The Print in India.

Novels
In 1992 Nasrin produced two novellas which failed to draw attention.

Her breakthrough novel Lajja (Shame) was published in 1993, and attracted wide attention because of its controversial subject matter. It contained the struggle of a patriotic Bangladeshi Hindu family in a Muslim environment. Initially written as a thin documentary, Lajja grew into a full-length novel as the author later revised it substantially. In six months' time, it sold 50,000 copies in Bangladesh before being banned by the government that same year.

Her other famous novel is French Lover, published in year 2002.

Autobiography
Amar Meyebela (My Girlhood, 2002), the first volume of her memoir, was banned by the Bangladeshi government in 1999 for "reckless comments" against Islam and the prophet Mohammad. Utal Hawa (Wild Wind), the second part of her memoir, was banned by the Bangladesh government in 2002. Ka (Speak up), the third part of her memoir, was banned by the Bangladeshi High Court in 2003. Under pressure from Indian Muslim activists, the book, which was published in West Bengal as Dwikhandita, was banned there also; some 3,000 copies were seized immediately. The decision to ban the book was criticized by "a host of authors" in West Bengal, but the ban was not lifted until 2005. Sei Sob Ondhokar (Those Dark Days), the fourth part of her memoir, was banned by the Bangladesh government in 2004.
To date, a total of seven parts of her autobiography have been published. "Ami bhalo nei tumi bhalo theko priyo desh", " Nei kichu nei" and "Nirbashito". All seven parts have been published by Peoples's Book Society, Kolkata.
She received her second Ananda Purashkar award in 2000, for her memoir Amar Meyebela (My Girlhood, published in English in 2002).

Nasrin's life and works in adaptation
Nasrin's life is the subject of a number of plays and songs, in the east and the west. The Swedish singer Magoria sang "Goddess in you, Taslima," and the French band Zebda composed "Don't worry, Taslima" as an homage.

Her work has been adapted for TV and even turned into music. Jhumur was a 2006 TV serial based on a story written especially for the show. Bengali singers like Fakir Alamgir, Samina Nabi, Rakhi Sen sang her songs. Steve Lacy, the jazz soprano saxophonist, met Nasrin in 1996 and collaborated with her on an adaptation of her poetry to music. The result, a "controversial" and "compelling" work called The Cry, was performed in Europe and North America. Initially, Nasrin was to recite during the performance, but these recitations were dropped after the 1996 Berlin world première because of security concerns.

Writers and intellectuals for and against Nasrin
Nasrin has been criticized by writers and intellectuals in both Bangladesh and West Bengal for targeted scandalisation. Because of "obnoxious, false and ludicrous" comments in Ka, "written with the 'intention to injure the reputation of the plaintiff'", Syed Shamsul Haq, Bangladeshi poet and novelist, filed a defamation suit against Nasrin in 2003. In the book, she mentions that Haq confessed to her that he had a relationship with his sister-in-law. A West Bengali poet, Hasmat Jalal, did the same; his suit led to the High Court banning the book, which was published in India as Dwikhondito. Nearly 4 million dollars were claimed in defamation lawsuits against her after the book was published. The West Bengal Government, supposedly pressured by 24 literary intellectuals, decided to ban Nasrin's book in 2003. Nasrin replied that she wrote about known people without their permission when some commented that she did it to earn fame. She defended herself against all the allegations. She wrote why she dared to reveal her sexual activities, saying that she wrote her life's story, not others'. Yet Nasrin enjoyed support from Bengali writers and intellectuals like Annada Shankar Ray, Sibnarayan Ray and Amlan Dutta.

Recently she was supported and defended by personalities such as author Mahasweta Devi, theatre director Bibhas Chakrabarty, poet Joy Goswami, artist Prakash Karmakar and Paritosh Sen. In India, noted writers Arundhati Roy, Girish Karnad, and others defended her when she was under house arrest in Delhi in 2007, and co-signed a statement calling on the Indian government to grant her permanent residency in India or, should she ask for it, citizenship. In Bangladesh writer and philosopher Kabir Chowdhury also supported her strongly.

Twitter
When Sri Lanka banned the burqa in 2019, Nasrin took to Twitter to show her support for the decision. She described the burqa as a 'mobile prison', a comment which was reported on by journalists.

In a 2019 tweet, she stated on Twitter that "Men and women who have bad genes with genetic diseases like diabetes, hypertension, cancer etc should not produce children. They have no right to make others suffer." Some commentators cited this as support for eugenics. Nasrin has denied this, stating that she is not a supporter of eugenics, and that her comment was not serious, and had been taken out of context.

Other activities
 Reporters Without Borders (RWB), Member of the Emeritus Board.

Awards
Taslima Nasrin has received international awards in recognition of her contribution towards the cause of freedom of expression. Awards and honors conferred on her include the following:
 Ananda Award or Ananda Puraskar from West Bengal, India in 1992 and 2000 for "Nirbachita Kolam" and "Amar Meyebela"
 Sakharov Prize for freedom of thoughts from European Parliament, in 1994
 Simone de Beauvoir Prize in 2008
 Human Rights Award from the Government of France, 1994
 Edict of Nantes Prize from France, 1994
 Kurt Tucholsky Prize, Swedish PEN, Sweden, 1994
 Feminist of the Year from Feminist Majority Foundation, US, 1994
 Scholarship from the German Academic Exchange Service, Germany, 1995
 Honorary Doctorate from Ghent University, Belgium, 1995 Overzicht eredoctoraten
 Distinguished Humanist Award from International Humanist and Ethical Union, Great Britain, 1996
 Erwin Fischer Award, International League of non-religious and atheists (IBKA), Germany, 2002
 Freethought Heroine Award, Freedom From Religion Foundation, US, 2002
 Fellowship at Carr Centre for Human Rights Policy, John F. Kennedy School of Government, Harvard University, US, 2003
 UNESCO-Madanjeet Singh Prize for the promotion of tolerance and non-violence, 2004
 Honorary doctorate from American University of Paris, 2005
 Grand Prix International Condorcet-Aron, 2005
 Woodrow Wilson Fellowship, US, 2009
 Feminist Press award, US, 2009
 Honorary doctorate from Universite Catholique de Louvain, Belgium, 2011
 Honorary citizenship from Esch, Luxembourg, 2011
 Honorary citizenship from Metz, France, 2011
 Honorary citizenship from Thionville, France, 2011
 Honorary doctorate from Paris Diderot University, Paris, France, 2011
 Universal Citizenship Passport. From Paris, France, 2013
 Academy Award from the Royal Academy of Arts, Science and Literature, Belgium, 2013
Honorary Associate of the National Secular Society

Bibliography

Poetry
 Shikore Bipul Khudha (Hunger in the Roots), 1982
 Nirbashito Bahire Ontore (Banished Without and Within), 1989
 Amar Kichu Jay Ashe Ne (I Couldn't Care Less), 1990
 Atole Ontorin (Captive in the Abyss), 1991
 Balikar Gollachut (Game of the Girls), 1992
 Behula Eka Bhashiyechilo Bhela (Behula Floated the Raft Alone), 1993
 Ay Kosto Jhepe, Jibon Debo Mepe (Pain Come Roaring Down, I'll Measure Out My Life for You), 1994
 Nirbashito Narir Kobita (Poems From Exile), 1996
 Jolpodyo (Waterlilies), 2000
 Khali Khali Lage (Feeling Empty), 2004
 Kicchukhan Thako (Stay for a While), 2005
 Bhalobaso? Cchai baso (It's your love! or a heap of trash!), 2007
 Bondini (Prisoner), 2008
 Golpo(stories),2018

Essay collections
 Nirbachito Column (Selected Columns), 1990
 Jabo na keno? jabo (I will go; why won't I?), 1991
 Noshto meyer noshto goddo (Fallen prose of a fallen girl), 1992
 ChoTo choTo dukkho kotha (Tale of trivial sorrows), 1994
 Narir Kono Desh Nei (Women have no country), 2007
 Nishiddho (Forbidden),2014
 Taslima Nasreener Godyo Podyo (Taslima Nasreen's prose and poetry), 2015
 Amar protibader bhasha (Language of my protest), 2016
 Sakal Griho Haralo Jar (A poet who lost everything), 2017
 Bhabnaguli (My thoughts), 2018
 Bhinnomot (Different opinions),2019

Novels
 Oporpokkho (The Opponent), 1992.
 Shodh, 1992. . Trans. in English as Getting Even.
 Nimontron (Invitation), 1993.
 Phera (Return), 1993.
 Lajja, 1993. . Trans. in English as Shame.
 Bhromor Koio Gia (Tell Him The Secret), 1994.
 Forashi Premik (French Lover), 2002.
 Brahmaputrer pare (At the bank of Brahmaputra river) 2013
 Beshorom (Shameless), 2019

Short stories
 Dukkhoboty Meye (Sad girls), 1994
 Minu, 2007

Autobiography
 Amar Meyebela (My girlhood), 1997
 Utal Hawa (Wild Wind), 2002
 Ka (Speak Up), 2003; published in West Bengal as Dwikhandito (Split-up in Two), 2003
 Sei Sob Andhokar (Those Dark Days), 2004
 Ami Bhalo Nei, Tumi Bhalo Theko Priyo Desh ("I am not okay, but you stay well my beloved homeland"), 2006.
 Nei, Kichu Nei (Nothing is there), 2010
 Nirbasan (Exile), 2012

Titles in English
 Split 
 Exile 
 French Lover 
 
 
  Trans. of Lajja.
 
  Trans. of Meyebela

Secondary works
 
 
 
 Hasan, Md. Mahmudul (July 2016), "Nasrin Gone Global: A Critique of Taslima Nasrin’s Criticism of Islam and Her Feminist Strategy." South Asia Research. 36(2): 167–185. Nasrin Gone Global: A Critique of Taslima Nasrin’s Criticism of Islam and Her Feminist Strategy

See also

 List of fatwas
 List of former Muslims
 Women in muslim societies
 The Cry (Steve Lacy album)

Notes

References

External links

 Women's untold stories: Michael Deibert interviews with Taslima Nasrin
 For freedom of expression by Taslima Nasrin

1962 births
Living people
20th-century Bengali poets
20th-century atheists
20th-century essayists
20th-century Bangladeshi women writers
21st-century Bangladeshi poets
21st-century Bengali poets
21st-century atheists
21st-century essayists
21st-century Bangladeshi women writers
Atheism activists
Atheist feminists
Attacks on secularists in Bangladesh
Bangladeshi atheists
Bangladeshi essayists
Bangladeshi exiles
Bangladeshi expatriates in India
Bangladeshi feminists
Bangladeshi former Muslims
Bangladeshi humanists
Bangladeshi memoirists
Bangladeshi secularists
Bangladeshi women essayists
Bangladeshi women novelists
Bangladeshi women poets
Bangladeshi writers
Bengali female poets
Bengali writers
Critics of Islam
Critics of creationism
Fatwas
Female critics of feminism
Former Muslim critics of Islam
Former Muslims turned agnostics or atheists
People from Mymensingh District
Recipients of the Ananda Purashkar
Secular humanists
Bangladeshi gynecologists
Sakharov Prize laureates